Sobornyi Avenue is the central thoroughfare of the city of Zaporizhzhia. It starts from Pryvokzalna Square near the Zaporizhzhia-1 railway station and ends at Zaporizhzhia Square near the Dnieper Hydroelectric Station. It runs along four city districts of Komunarskyi, Oleksandrivskyi, Voznesenivskyi and Dniprovskyi.

The avenue begins near the Zaporizhzhia-I railway station and ends at Zaporizhzhia Square near the Dniprovskaya HPP. However, Soborny Avenue is surpassed in length by Heroiv Kharkova Avenue in Kharkiv ) an Lenin Avenue in Volgograd. The residential quarters of "Sotsmista" in the area of the Dnipro HPP dam and Metalurgiv Avenue are considered to be one of the best examples of constructivist architecture of the first half of the 20th century. The project of this architectural ensemble in 1932 received a gold medal at an exhibition in Paris. Sobornyi Avenue claims the title of one of the "7 Wonders of Zaporizhzhia".

References

Streets in Zaporizhzhia